Sristi TV is a 24-hour Bengali entertainment channel launched on 1 January 2005. The channel broadcasts entertainment programs in Bangla.

References

Bengali-language television channels in India
Television channels and stations established in 2005
Television stations in Kolkata